Cedar Creek is a stream in Taney County, Missouri, United States. It is a tributary of Bull Shoals Lake. The stream headwaters are in the Mark Twain National Forest on the southwest flank of Lime Kiln Mountain. The stream flows generally west and enters the lake just south of Beaver Creek Park about four miles from its source.

Cedar Creek was so named on account of cedar timber near its course.

See also
List of rivers of Missouri

References

Rivers of Taney County, Missouri
Rivers of Missouri